West African dwarf may refer to

 A little person from West Africa
 West African Dwarf goat, a breed or landrace of domestic goat
 West African dwarf pig, a landrace of domestic pig
 West African Dwarf sheep, a breed or landrace of domestic sheep